The FEI Show Jumping World Cup is an annual international competition among the world’s best show jumping horses and riders. The series, created in 1978, today comprises 14 leagues on all continents. The best riders from 132 preliminary competitions  qualify for the final. The FEI World Cup was thought up by a Swiss journalist and show jumping enthusiast, Max E. Ammann. From its inception until 1999 both the final and qualifiers were sponsored by Volvo. From 1999 to 2013, the series has been sponsored by Rolex. Longines has been the title sponsor of the series from October 2013.

Approximately 45 riders qualify from 13 leagues around the world. Usually there are 20 riders from Europe, 15 from the United States, 5 from Canada and 5 from elsewhere in the world. In the 28 World Cup finals held until 2007, United States riders have emerged with the most titles, having won the championship 
seven times. Hugo Simon was the first rider to win the FEI World Cup three times, followed by Rodrigo Pessoa. Mario Deslauriers is so far the youngest winner, aged 19, in the competition's history riding Aramis in 1984. At the beginning, the final was a rather complicated process and in 1981 its formula was modified. Since then it has not been changed. It starts with a table C (speed), followed by a jump-off competition and, after one day's rest, a two-round final not against the clock.

The FEI World Cup Final is usually held in April of each year.

Results
1979 Gothenburg (SWE) 
1. Hugo Simon         – Gladstone, 18, 0/24.50 secs 
2. Katie Monahan  – The Jones Boy, 18, 4/25.40
3. Eddie Macken  – Carrolls of Dundalk, 6
3. Norman Dello Joio  – Allegro, 6

1980 Baltimore (USA) 
1. Conrad Homfeld     – Balbuco, 47.50 
2. Melanie Smith        – Calypso, 44.50
3. Paul Schockemöhle  – El Paso, 42

1981 Birmingham, England (GBR) 
1. Michael Matz  – Jet Run, 39 
2. Donald Cheska  – Southside, 37
3. Hugo Simon     – Gladstone, 35.50

1982 Gothenburg (SWE) 
1. Melanie Smith     – Calypso, 0 penalties
2. Paul Schockemöhle  – Akrobat, 1
3. Hugo Simon         – Gladstone, 10
3. John Whitaker     – Ryan's Son, 10

1983 Vienna (AUT) 
1. Norman Dello Joio  – I Love You, 0 penalties
2. Hugo Simon         – Gladstone, 4
3. Melanie Smith      – Calypso, 7.50

1984 Gothenburg (SWE) 
1. Mario Deslauriers  – Aramis, 4 penalties
2. Norman Dello Joio   – I Love You, 5
2. Nelson Pessoa      – Moët & Chandon Larramy, 5

1985 Berlin (FRG) 
1. Conrad Homfeld  – Abdullah, 3 penalties
2. Nick Skelton  – Everest St James, 4
3. Pierre Durand  – Jappeloup, 8.50

1986 Gothenburg (SWE) 
1. Leslie Burr Lenehan  – McLain, 0 penalties
2. Ian Millar  – Big Ben, 13
3. Conrad Homfeld  – Maybe, 16.50

1987 Paris (FRA) 
1. Katharine Burdsall  – The Natural, 4.50 penalties
2. Philippe Rozier    – Malesan Jiva, 7.50
3. Lisa Jacquin       – For The Moment, 8

1988 Gothenburg (SWE) 
1. Ian Millar       – Big Ben, 4 penalties
2. Pierre Durand    – Jappeloup de Luze, 8.5
3. Philippe Le Jeune  – Nistria, 12.5

1989 Tampa (USA) 
1. Ian Millar       – Big Ben, 0 penalties
2. John Whitaker    – Next Milton, 10.75
3. George Lindeman  – Jupiter, 14.5

1990 Dortmund (GER) 
1. John Whitaker    – Henderson Milton, 4 penalties
2. Pierre Durand    – Jappeloup, 12.50
3. Franke Sloothaak  – Walzerkönig, 14

1991 Gothenburg (SWE) 
1. John Whitaker    – Henderson Milton, 1.50 penalties
2. Nelson Pessoa    – Special Envoy, 5
3. Roger-Yves Bost  – Norton de Rhuys, 5.50

1992 Del Mar (USA) (Final was held outdoors)
1. Thomas Frühmann       – Bockmann's Genius, 0 penalties
2. Lesley McNaught-Mändli  – Moet & Chandon Pirol, 10.5
3. Markus Fuchs  – Interpane Shandor, 11
4 Thomas Fuchs  – Dylano, 11.5
5 Bernie Traurig  – Maybe Forever, 12
6 Ludger Beerbaum - 12.5

1993 Gothenburg (SWE) 
1. Ludger Beerbaum  – Almox Ratina Z, 8 penalties
2. John Whitaker    – Everest Grannusch & Everest Milton, 10.5
3. Michael Matz  – Rhum, 12.5
4. Susan Hutchison  – Samsung Woodstock, 14.5
5. Beezie Patton    – Ping Pong & French Rapture, 19.5
6. René Tebbel      – Dexter, 22

1994 's-Hertogenbosch (NLD) 
1. Jos Lansink      – Bollvorms Libero H, 0 penalties
2. Franke Sloothaak  – Dorina & Weihaiwej, 9.5
3. Michael Whitaker  – Midnight Madness, 14
4. Hugo Simon       – Apricot D, 14.25
5. Dirk Hafemeister  – PS Priamos, 16
6. Jenny Zoer       – Desteny AZ, 18

1995 Gothenburg (SWE) 
1. Nick Skelton          – Everest Dollar Girl, 7 penalties
2. Lars Nieberg           – For Pleasure, 9
3. Lesley McNaught-Mändli  – Barcelona SVH & Doenhoff, 13
4. Ludger Beerbaum        – Gaylord & Ratina Z, 14.5
5. Michael Whitaker       – Everest Two Step, 16.5
6. Peter Eriksson         – Robin Z, 17

1996 Geneve (SUI) 
1. Hugo Simon       – E.T., 10 penalties, 0/49.03 secs
2. Willi Melliger   – Calvaro V, 10, 0/51.10 
3. Nick Skelton     – Dollar Girl, 11
4. Rodrigo Pessoa   – Special Envoy & Tomboy, 12.5
5. Franke Sloothaak  – Corrado & Weihaiwej, 13.75
6. Ludger Beerbaum  – Gaylord & Rush On, 17
7. Malin Baryard  – Corrmint, 17.75

1997 Gothenburg (SWE)
1. Hugo Simon       – E.T. FRH, 0 penalties
2. John Whitaker    – Grannush & Welham, 3.50
3. Franke Sloothaak  – San Patrignano Joly, 6
4. Beat Mändli      – City Banking, 10.50
5. Anne Kursinski   – Eros, 12.50
6. Peter Geerink    – LBHR Bravour, 14

1998 Helsinki (FIN) 
1. Rodrigo Pessoa  – Loro Piana Baloubet du Rouet, 6.5 penalties
2. Lars Nieberg           – Esprit, 7.5
3. Ludger Beerbaum        – P.S. Priamos, 12.5
4. René Tebbel            – Radiator, 16
4. Richard Spooner        – Cosino, 16
6. Margie Goldstein-Engle  – Hidden Creek's Alvaretto, 16.5
6. Leslie Burr-Howard     – S'Blieft, 16.5

1999 Gothenburg (SWE)
1. Rodrigo Pessoa   – Gandini Baloubet du Rouet, 4 penalties
2. Trevor Coyle     – Cruising, 5.5 
3. René Tebbel      – Radiator, 8.25 
4. Beat Mändli     – Pozitano, 11.5 
5. Michael Whitaker  – Virutual Village Ashley, 15 
6. Ludger Beerbaum  – Ratina Z & P S Priamos, 17

2000 Las Vegas (USA) 
1. Rodrigo Pessoa     – Baloubet du Rouet, 0 penalties
2. Markus Fuchs       – Tinkas Boy, 7.5 
3. Beat Mändli        – Pozitano, 10 
4. Ludger Beerbaum    – Goldfever, 11.5 
5. Ludo Philippaerts  – Verelst Otterongo, 14 
6. Peter Charles      – Corrada, 19

2001 Gothenburg (SWE)
1. Markus Fuchs    – Tinka's Boy, 5 penalties, 0/35,25 secs
2. Rodrigo Pessoa   – Baloubet du Rouet, 5, 8/33,90 
3. Michael Whitaker  – Handel II, 8 
4. Willi Melliger   – Calvaro V, 10 
5. Candice King     – John Em, 17 
6. Leslie Howard    – Priobert de Kalvarie, 18 
6. Peter Wylde      – Fein Cera, 18

2002 Leipzig (GER) 
1. Otto Becker          – Dobels Cento, 7 penalties
2. Ludger Beerbaum       – Gladdys S, 8 
3. Rodrigo Pessoa        – Baloubet du Rouet, 11 
4. McLain Ward           – Viktor, 14 
4. Leslie Howard         – Priobert de Kalvarie, 14 
6. Toni Hassmann        – MobilComs Goldika, 15 
7. Rolf-Göran Bengtsson  – Isovlas Pialotta, 16 
7. Malin Baryard         – H&M Butterfly Flip, 16

2003 Las Vegas (USA) 
1. Marcus Ehning     – Anka, 2 penalties 
2. Rodrigo Pessoa    – Baloubet du Rouet, 6 
3. Malin Baryard     – H&M Butterfly Flip, 8 
4. Lars Nieberg      – Fighting Alpha, 10 
5. Laura Kraut      – Anthem, 13 
5. Markus Fuchs      – Tinka's Boy, 13

2004 Milan (ITA) 21 – 25 April
1. Bruno Broucqsault  – Dileme de Cephe, 0 penalties
2. Meredith Michaels-Beerbaum   – Shutterfly, 4 
3. Markus Fuchs  – Tinka's Boy, 8 
4. Eugenie Angot  – Cigale du Taillis, 9 
5. Marco Kutscher  – Montender II, 13

2005 Las Vegas (USA) 21 – 24 April
1. Meredith Michaels-Beerbaum  – Shutterfly, 4 penalties
2. Michael Whitaker  – Portofino 63, 7 
3. Marcus Ehning  – Gitania 8, 9 
3. Lars Nieberg  – Lucie 55, 9 
5. Kimberly Frey  – Marlou, 10 
6. Steve Guerdat  – Pialotta, 11 
7. Rodrigo Pessoa  – Baloubet du Rouet, 12 
8. Marco Kutscher  – Cash 63, 15 
9. Ludo Philippaerts  – Parco, 16 
9. Alois Pollmann-Schweckhorst  – Candy 195, 16

2006 Kuala Lumpur (MAS) 26 – 30 April
1. Marcus Ehning  – Sandro Boy, 0 penalties
2. Jessica Kürten  – Castle Forbes Libertina, 1 
3. Beat Mändli  – Ideo du Thot, 4 
4. Juan Carlos Garcia  – Loro Piana Albin III,  6 
5. Meredith Michaels-Beerbaum  – Checkmate,  8 
6. Michael Whitaker  – Insul Tech Portofino, 10 
7. Rolf-Göran Bengtsson  – Mac Kinley, 12 
8. Pia-Luise Aufrecht  – Hofgut Liederbach's Abrisca, 13 
8. Gerco Schröder  – Eurocommerce Milano, 13 
10. Heinrich Hermann Engemann  – Aboyeur W, 14

2007 Las Vegas (USA) 19 – 22 April
1. Beat Mändli  – Ideo du Thot, 5 penalties
2. Daniel Deusser  – Air Jordan Z, 11
T3. Markus Beerbaum  – Leena, 12
T3. Steve Guerdat  – Tresor, 12
5. Marcus Ehning  – Gitania, 13
T6. Alois Pollmann-Schweckhorst  – Candy, 14
T6. Christian Ahlmann  – Cöster, 14
T8. Marco Kutscher  – Cash, 15
T8. McLain Ward  – Sapphire, 15
10. Malin Baryard-Johnsson  – Butterfly Flip, 17

2008 Gothenburg (SWE) 24 – 27 April 
1. Meredith Michaels-Beerbaum  – Shutterfly, 4 penalties 
2. Rich Fellers  – Flexible, 6
3. Heinrich-Hermann Engemann  – Aboyeur W, 9
T4. Jessica Kürten  – Castle Forbes Libertina, 12
T4. Ludger Beerbaum  – All Inclusive NRW, 12
T4. Beat Mandli  – Ideo du Thot, 12
T7. Steve Guerdat  – Tresor, 15
T7. Peter Wylde  – Esplanade, 15
9. Michael Whitaker  – Suncal Portofino, 18
10. Rolf-Göran Bengtsson  – Ninja la Silla, 19

2009 Las Vegas (USA) 15 – 19 April 
1. Meredith Michaels-Beerbaum  – Shutterfly, 0 penalties
2. McLain Ward  – Sapphire, 2 
3. Albert Zoer  – Okidoki, 4 
4. Christina Liebherr  – LB No Mercy, 7 
5. Rodrigo Pessoa  – Rufus, 12 
6. Ludger Beerbaum  – Coupe de Coeur, 14
7. Ben Maher  – Robin Hood W, 18 
T8. Steve Guerdat  – Tresor, 19 
T8. Thomas Velin  – Grim st. Clair, 19 
T10. Daniel Etter  – Peu a Peu, 24 
T10. Marcus Ehning  – Leconte, 24

2010 Le Grand-Saconnex near Geneva (SUI) 14 – 18 April
 1. Marcus Ehning  – Noltes Küchengirl & Plot Blue, 6 penalties
 T2. Ludger Beerbaum  – Gotha, 7
 T2. Pius Schwizer  – Ulysse & Carlina, 7
 4. Luciana Diniz  – Winningmood, 9
 5. Dermott Lennon  – Hallmark Elite, 10

2011 Leipzig (GER) 27 April – 1 May
 1. Christian Ahlmann  – Taloubet Z, 4 penalties
 2. Eric Lamaze  – Hickstead, 10
 3. Jeroen Dubbeldam  – Simon, 11
 T4. Marco Kutscher  – Cash, 12
 T4. Beezie Madden  – Danny Boy & Coral Reef Via Volo, 12

2012 's-Hertogenbosch (NLD) 19 April – 22 April
 1. Rich Fellers  – Flexible, 1 penalty, 0/25.97 secs
 2. Steve Guerdat  – Nino des Buissonnets, 1 penalty, 0/26.61 secs
 3. Pius Schwizer  – Ulysse & Carlina, 5 penalties
 4. Philipp Weishaupt  – Souvenir & Monte Bellini, 10
 5. Kevin Staut  – Silvana, 11

2013 Gothenburg (SWE) 24 April – 28 April, course designer Uliano Vezzani (ITA).
 1. Beezie Madden  – Simon, 9 penalties, Jump-Off: 0 penalty, Time: 41.66 secs 
 2. Steve Guerdat  – Nino des Buissonnets, 9, J-O: 8/30.33 secs
 3. Kevin Staut  – Silvana HDC, 10 penalties
 4. Sergio Alvarez Moya  – Carlo 273, 12
 5. McLain Ward  – Super Trooper de Ness, 13

2014 Lyon (FRA) 17 April – 24 April, course designer Frank Rothenberger (GER).
 1. Daniel Deusser  – Cornet d'Amour, 2 penalties 
 2. Ludger Beerbaum  – Chaman & Chiara 222, 4
 3. Scott Brash  – Ursula XII, 5 penalties
 4. Marcus Ehning  – Cornado I NRW, 6
 5. Steve Guerdat  – Nino des Buissonnets, 8

2015 Las Vegas (USA) 16 April – 19 April, course designer Anthony d'Ambrosio (USA).
 1. Steve Guerdat  – Albfuehren's Paille, 8 penalties 
 2. Pénélope Leprevost  – Vagabond de la Pomme, 9, Time: 65.30 secs
 3. Bertram Allen  – Molly Malone V, 9, Time: 65.87
 4. Beezie Madden  – Simon, 10, Time: 65.78
 5. Jos Verlooy  – Domino, 10, Time: 67.34

2016 Gothenburg (SWE) 23 March – 28 March, course designer Santiago Varela (ESP).
 1. Steve Guerdat  – Corbinian, 0 penalties 
 2. Harrie Smolders  – Emerald N.O.P., 3, Time: 65.45 secs
 3. Daniel Deusser  – Cornet d’Amour, 3, Time: 66.17
 4. Marcus Ehning  – Cornado NRW, 6, Time: 66.67
 5. Denis Lynch  – All Star 5, 8, Time: 65.38

2017 Omaha (USA) 30 March – 2 April, course designer Alan Wade (IRL).
 1. McLain Ward  – HH Azur, 0 penalties 
 2. Romain Duguet  – Twentytwo des Biches, 4
 3. Henrik von Eckermann  – Mary Lou, 8
 4. Martin Fuchs  – Clooney, 9
 5. Sergio Alvarez Moya  – Arrayan, 9

2018 Paris (FRA) 11 April – 15 April, course designer Santiago Varela (ESP).
1. Beezie Madden  - Breitling LS, 4 penalties 
2. Devin Ryan  - Eddie Blue, 6
3. Henrik von Eckermann  – Toveks Mary Lou, 8
4. McLain Ward  – HH Azur, 16
5. Olivier Philippaerts  - H&M Legend of Love, 16

2019 Gothenburg (SWE) 3 April - 7 April
1. Steve Guerdat  - Alamo, 2 penalties.
2. Martin Fuchs   - Clooney 51, 3 penalties.
3. Peder Fredricson  - Catch Me Not S, 5 penalties.
4. Daniel Deusser  - Scuderia 1918 Tobago Z, 6 penalties.
5. Niels Bruynseels  - Delux van T & L, 11 penalties.

2020 Las Vegas (USA) 15 April - 19 April
Cancelled due to the COVID-19 pandemic

2021 Gothenburg (SWE) 31 March - 4 April
Cancelled due to an outbreak of Equid alphaherpesvirus 1

2022 Leipzig (GER) 6 April - 10 April
1. Martin Fuchs   - Chaplin, 5 penalties. Time: 60.83 secs
2. Harrie Smolders  - Monaco, 8 penalties. Time: 61.99
3. Jens Fredricson  - Markan Cosmopolit, 8 penalties. Time: 62.35
4. Harry Charles  - Stardust, 9 penalties. Time: 60.53
5. Jack Whitaker  - Equine America Valmy De La Lande, 9 penalties. Time: 62.12

References

External links 
2007 FEI World Cup Final Las Vegas, USA
Official FEI results website
2020 FEI World Cup, cancelled

 
Show jumping events
Showjumping, World Cup